Hidalgo is a genus of moths in the family Geometridae described by Rindge in 1983.

Species
Hidalgo maidiena Dyar, 1913
Hidalgo terranea Warren, 1907

References

Geometridae